Homer is an independent American luxury jewelry and accessories brand founded in 2018 and commercially launched in New York City in August 2021 by Frank Ocean.  

The name Homer refers to the Ancient Greek author of the Iliad and the Odyssey.

Products 
The launch collection features high-end jewelry, using lab-grown diamonds crafted in the United States and hand-made in Italy, together with silk scarves and other accessories.    

The jewelry is crafted using a combination of recycled sterling silver, 18 carat gold and set with diamonds, often also incorporating colourful, hand-painted enamel. Ocean’s designs are quoted as being inspired by the concepts of “… heritage as fantasy …” and “… childhood obsessions …”

The brand’s catalogue features photography by Ocean and  Tyrone Lebon.

Store 
Homer has a flagship store  in New York’s historic Jewellers’ Exchange on the Bowery. It was designed by Ocean in tandem with New York-based architects ANY.

Collaborations 
In 2021, Homer collaborated with Italian luxury brand Prada on a limited, custom collection of branded clothing and accessories, including an anorak, belt bag and backpack, all featuring the brand’s distinctive colour scheme.

References

Luxury brands
Jewelry companies of the United States
Frank Ocean